Gardenzitty was a well-known Czech  soundsystem from Prague playing  drum and bass. During their career they became one of the favourite sound systems on the Czech jungle-music scene. They were influenced with several music styles like reggae dancehall, old school hardcore jungle, bhangra, drum and bass and many others.

Members

DJs
 Technical
 Alert
 Errphorz
 Shin
 F99
 Mara

MCs
 Dr. Kary
 Nu C

References

Sound systems
DIY culture